Bani Qa'is District is a district of the Hajjah Governorate, Yemen. In 2003, the district had a population of 54,272.

References

Districts of Hajjah Governorate